Joseph F. Wallworth (February 24, 1876 – August 20, 1933) was an American businessman, realtor, and politician from New Jersey.

Life 
Wallworth was born on February 24, 1876, in Philadelphia, Pennsylvania, the son of Joseph Wallworth and Georgiana Dean. His father was an English immigrant from Manchester, England.

Wallworth attended public school in Philadelphia and Upland. When he was fifteen, he entered his father's firm, dealers in cotton and wool waste. He was a road salesman for the firm for several years, and was later admitted to the firm. In 1914, he took over the business and ran it himself. The firm was known as J. Wallworth & Sons. He resided in Haddonfield, New Jersey.

Wallworth was a member of the Camden County Republican Executive Committee. In 1918, he was elected to the New Jersey General Assembly as a Republican, serving as one of the three representatives for Camden County. He served in the Assembly in 1919 and 1920. In 1920, he was elected to the New Jersey Senate, representing Camden County. He served in the Senate in 1921, 1922, and 1923. He was chosen President of the Senate in 1923.

In 1921, Wallworth sold his firm and became a realtor, working in real estate development in Camden County. He maintained offices in Camden and Ocean City. After he finished his term in the Senate, he became chairman of the Republican County Committee. He later became chairman of the Camden County Park Commission.

Wallworth was president of the Haddonfield Republican Club and a member of the Shriners, the Elks, the Union League of Philadelphia, the Freemasons, and the Tavistock Country Club. During World War I, he was chairman of the Camden Red Cross campaign and was active in the Salvation Army drive. He was a member of the Presbyterian Church. In 1906, he married Emma W. Gerber of Wilmington, Delaware. They had one child, Josephine Ellen.

Wallworth shot himself at his home on August 20, 1933. The pallbearers at his funeral included former U.S. Senator David Baird Jr., Congressman Charles A. Wolverton, State Senator Albert S. Woodruff, Mayor Roy R. Stewart, former mayor Winfield S. Price, J. David Stern, and William T. Read. His funeral was in the Harleigh Cemetery-Mausoleum.

References

External links 

 The Political Graveyard

1876 births
1933 deaths
American people of English descent
Businesspeople from Philadelphia
Politicians from Philadelphia
People from Haddonfield, New Jersey
Politicians from Camden County, New Jersey
20th-century American businesspeople
Businesspeople from New Jersey
American real estate brokers
20th-century American politicians
Republican Party members of the New Jersey General Assembly
Presidents of the New Jersey Senate
Republican Party New Jersey state senators
American Freemasons
American Presbyterians
American politicians who committed suicide
Suicides by firearm in New Jersey
1933 suicides
Burials at Harleigh Cemetery, Camden